Geoff Marshall is an English video producer, performer, and author from London who runs a YouTube channel which is predominantly transport-themed. Born in London, he spent a short period living in the United States between 2006 and 2009, and now resides in South London.

London Underground station visit records 
Marshall has twice held the world record for the Tube Challenge: travelling to all London Underground stations in the fastest time possible. Marshall's first record time to visit the then 275 stations was achieved with Neil Blake in 18 hours 35 minutes and 43 seconds in May 2004, on his seventh attempt. This beat the previous world record of 19 hours, 18 minutes and 45 seconds that was achieved by Jack Welsby in April 2002.

His second record time of 16 hours, 20 minutes and 27 seconds, was set in August 2013. A previous attempt which came close was covered by BBC News as part of London Underground's 150 year celebrations.

Marshall subsequently wrote the stage show TubeSpotting about his multiple attempts which he performed at the Edinburgh Festival Fringe in 2014 and several times since at the London Transport Museum.

TV and radio appearances 

Marshall occasionally gives interviews on London TV and radio, concerning transport stories but first appeared on TV featuring in series 1 of ITV documentary The Tube. The second episode, titled "24 Hours", shows his failed attempt to beat Jack Welsby's Tube Challenge world record. This was followed later in 2003 by Race Around The Underground, part of Carlton Television's "Metroland" documentary series, where Marshall would have broken the record had the Richmond Branch of the District Line not suffered a signal failure.

He appeared on Sky 1's quiz show The Fanatics, answering question about the London Underground and then appeared in an episode of More4's The World's Most Beautiful Railway in September 2019 highlighting the  Caledonian Sleeper and Corrour railway station in the Scottish highlands.

Londonist 
Between 2013 and 2018, Marshall was a contributor to Londonist. One of the website's video series was Secrets of the Underground, where Marshall presented little-known facts of the London Underground. The 17-episode series originally featured just the 11 London Underground lines, but later episodes were produced for the DLR, Overground, and Tramlink networks as well as bonus episodes. The series received over eleven million combined views.

Solo YouTube channel 
Marshall's solo channel publishes mostly transport-related content; covering both London and British rail issues in a wider scope. One reoccurring feature is Least Used Stations, where he uses Office of Rail and Road statistics to determine which station in a given county had the lowest ridership in the previous statistical year, then visits said station to review its amenities (or lack thereof). He is also part of the way through visiting all of the UK's request stops.

All the Stations 

All the Stations was a project organised by Marshall and Vicki Pipe, to visit all 2,563 UK railway stations in the summer of 2017. The pair filmed much of the journey with daily updates posted on YouTube. They also posted updates to Periscope, Twitter, Facebook and Instagram during the journey. A feature-length documentary about the journey was produced in 2018.

The series consisted of 59 main videos and 12 bonus videos. Marshall and Pipe visited every station in Great Britain including those that are served by only a small number of trains,  including Shippea Hill station on 3 June where 19 people joined them, meaning more passengers used the station in a single day than had in the whole of the previous year.

In 2019, Marshall and Pipe crowdfunded All the Stations Ireland where they spent three weeks visiting all 198 railway stations in Northern Ireland and the Republic of Ireland during March and April 2019. Subsequently, they spent three days in July 2019 visiting the Isle of Man to travel to every station on the island.

Underground: USA 
Underground: USA was a 12-week documentary road trip which Marshall undertook between June and September 2009 in the US. He travelled to all 48 mainland states and in each one visited a town or a place that shared a name with a station on the London Underground map – for example, Epping, Maine, where the journey started. Despite having his filming equipment stolen during the trip, Marshall turned the story into a one-hour YouTube documentary as well as publishing an accompanying book.

Charity events 
Marshall first organised a tube-based charity event in 2005 with Tube Relief, in response to the 7 July 2005 London bombings. Using the slogan "Not Afraid", around 50 people took part and raised over £11,000 for the London Bombings Relief Charitable Fund.

Subsequently, Marshall organised a series of Walk the Tube events to raise money for charities, by getting a group of people to visit every tube station but not as a record attempt. These events took place in 2014, 2015, and 2016.

Bibliography

References 

Living people
English YouTubers
People associated with transport in London
YouTubers from London
YouTube travel vloggers
1972 births